Events from the year 1652 in Sweden

Incumbents
 Monarch – Christina

Events

  
 
 
 
 Pierre Bourdelot arrives in Sweden
 Magnus Gabriel De la Gardie becomes Lord High Treasurer
Great Oulu Fire of 1652

Births

Deaths

 16 March - Beata Oxenstierna, courtier (born 1591) 
 19 June - Louis De Geer (1587–1652), merchant and industrialist   (born 1587) 
 22 August - Jacob De la Gardie, soldier and politician  (born 1583)

References

 
Years of the 17th century in Sweden
Sweden